David Faramola Oniya (5 June 1985 – 13 June 2015) was a Nigerian footballer who played for Malaysia Premier League club T-Team as a defender.

Club career
In mid-2007, Oniya moved to Uzbekistan, signing a contract with Dinamo Samarqand. Oniya played for Dinamo Samarqand for 4 seasons, becoming the team's captain before signing for Bunyodkor in December 2011. Oniya left Bunyodkor in February 2012 before the start of the season, signing for Sogdiana Jizzakh for the first half of the year and then joined Buxoro in the summer of 2012.

In early 2014, Oniya signed for Neftchi Fergana, but did not pass a medical examination and therefore was not allowed to be registered by the Uzbekistan Football Federation. Oniya's contract with Neftchi Fergana was terminated in the summer of 2014. In the autumn of 2014 Oniya moved to Malaysia signing for T–Team.

Death
On 13 June 2015, Oniya died after collapsing on the pitch in Malaysia during a friendly between his club T-Team and Kelantan. His body was laid to rest at a Christian cemetery in Seremban, Negeri Sembilan two weeks later.

References

External links
 

1985 births
2015 deaths
Nigerian footballers
Association football defenders
Buxoro FK players
FK Dinamo Samarqand players
Association football players who died while playing
Nigerian expatriate footballers
Expatriate footballers in Malaysia
Expatriate footballers in Uzbekistan
Expatriate footballers in Azerbaijan
People from Lagos
Terengganu F.C. II players
Sportspeople from Lagos
Sport deaths in Malaysia
Residents of Lagos